The Church of Jesus Christ of Latter-day Saints in Illinois refers to the Church of Jesus Christ of Latter-day Saints (LDS Church) and its members in Illinois. The official church membership as a percentage of general population was 0.44% in 2014. According to the 2014 Pew Forum on Religion & Public Life survey, less than 1% of Illinoisans self-identify themselves most closely with The Church of Jesus Christ of Latter-day Saints. The LDS Church is the 13th largest denomination in Illinois.

Stakes are located in Buffalo Grove, Champaign, Chicago, Joliet, Naperville, Nauvoo, O'Fallon, Peoria, Rockford, Schaumburg, Springfield and Wilmette.

History

In 1839, to escape persecution—including an extermination order given by Missouri governor Lilburn Boggs—the Latter-day Saints drained swamplands on the eastern banks of the Mississippi River and established the city of Nauvoo.

Joseph Smith was killed on June 27, 1844, by an angry mob that stormed Carthage Jail in Carthage, Illinois where Smith was being held.

In 2004, Illinois's lieutenant governor, Pat Quinn, presented church leaders a copy of House Resolution 793, which expressed official regret for the violence that caused the Mormons to leave in 1846.

Stakes

As of February 2023, the following stakes had congregations located in Illinois:

 *Stakes outside of state with congregations in Illinois

Missions

 Illinois Chicago Mission (1983–present)

Former missions
 Northern States Mission (1889-1973)
 Illinois Mission (1973-1974)
 Illinois Chicago Mission (1974-1980)
 Illinois Chicago North Mission (1980-1983)
 Illinois Nauvoo Mission

Temples

See also

The Church of Jesus Christ of Latter-day Saints membership statistics (United States)
Illinois: Religion
Nauvoo, Illinois
Carthage Jail

References

External links
 Newsroom - Illinois
 ComeUntoChrist.org Latter-day Saints Visitor site
 The Church of Jesus Christ of Latter-day Saints Official site

 
Illinois